Lophiaspis is an extinct genus of early perissodactyl endemic to southern Europe during the Early to Middle Eocene, living from 55.8 to 37.2 Ma. Remains have been found from France, Spain, and Portugal.

References

Prehistoric mammals of Europe
Eocene
Fossil taxa described in 1910